James Terry Roach (February 18, 1960 – January 10, 1986) was the second person to be executed by the state of South Carolina following the 1976 decision by the U.S. Supreme Court reauthorizing the use of capital punishment by the states. He was electrocuted on January 10, 1986, aged 25, nearly a year to the day following the electrocution of his accomplice, Joseph Carl Shaw, on January 11, 1985, at the Central Correctional Institution in Columbia. Roach was executed for a crime he committed at age 17.

On December 13, 1977, upon the advice of his lawyer, Roach pleaded guilty to two counts of murder, criminal sexual conduct, kidnapping, and robbery. He was convicted of the rape and murder of a fourteen-year-old girl and the murder of her seventeen-year-old boyfriend. Evidence presented at the trial showed that Roach was mentally handicapped, with an I.Q. between 75 and 80 and that he was probably suffering from Huntington's Chorea. Moreover, the sentencing judge found that Roach was under the influence of Shaw when the crimes were committed. Despite these mitigating factors, the sentencing judge declared that the death penalty was warranted in this case. Shaw was executed by electrocution on January 10, 1986, at the Central Correctional Institution in Columbia, South Carolina, aged 25.

Roach's sentence was upheld on appeal by the South Carolina Supreme Court. Several attempts to seek review of the case or to bring a petition of habeas corpus were unsuccessful. The US Supreme Court declined to grant him certiorari.

Pleas for legal reconsideration came from the United Nations, international figures, and former president Jimmy Carter. Governor Richard Riley denied clemency.

On January 10, 1986, Roach, was strapped into the electric chair and gave his last words: "To my family and friends, there is only three words to say: I love you." He then gave a thumbs-up sign, reportedly to signal he was ready to die. He was pronounced dead at 5:16 a.m.

The case of Roach was brought before the Inter-American Commission on Human Rights, which found by five votes to one that the United States Government had violated Article I (Right to Life) and Article II (right to equality before the law) of the American Declaration of the Rights and Duties of Man in executing Roach. This was the first time the United States was found to be in violation of its human rights obligations under the aforementioned Declaration.

The murders
On October 29, 1977, Roach and accomplices Joseph Carl Shaw and Ronald Eugene Mahaffey spent the morning drinking beer and doing drugs. The three then spent the early afternoon driving around in an attempt to "find a girl to rape," according to Mahaffey.

After pulling beside a parked car at a baseball field outside of Columbia, South Carolina, Roach aimed a .22 caliber rifle at the car's occupants, 14-year old Carlotta Hartness and 17-year old Thomas Taylor. Roach demanded they give them their money and Taylor obliged. Shaw and Mahaffey then got out of the car, took Taylor's keys, and forced Carlotta into the backseat of Shaw's car. Once back in the car, Shaw said to Roach "OK, now!" to which Roach fired the rifle into the parked car, killing Thomas Taylor.

Carlotta was then driven to a dirt road not far away where they demanded she undress. She was forced to perform oral sex on Shaw and Mahaffey and was raped repeatedly by all three. Once they were finished, Shaw then asked who would kill her. Roach volunteered to be the one to shoot the girl. Shaw ordered Carlotta to lay face down on the ground, to which she initially refused and pled with them to spare her life. Eventually giving in to their demands, she put her face to the ground, and Roach shot her several times in the head. Shaw shot her in the head once more, then buried the rifle, bullets, and wallet they had stolen from Taylor earlier. The three then returned to the baseball field to confirm that Taylor was dead.

See also
 Capital punishment for juveniles in the United States
 Capital punishment in South Carolina
 Capital punishment in the United States
 List of people executed in South Carolina
 Roper v. Simmons: 2005 U.S. Supreme Court ruling that the execution of those under 18 (at the time of committing the capital crime) is unconstitutional.
 Thompson v. Oklahoma: 1988 U.S. Supreme Court ruling that the execution of those who committed their crime when under the age of 16 is unconstitutional.

General references

Sources
 U.S. Executions Since 1976, at The Office of the Clark County Prosecuting Attorney . Retrieved on 2007-11-12.
  
 

1960 births
1986 deaths
20th-century executions of American people
20th-century executions by South Carolina
Minors convicted of murder
American people executed for murder
People from Greenville, South Carolina
People convicted of murder by South Carolina
People executed by South Carolina by electric chair
Juvenile offenders executed by the United States